was a Japanese media company headquartered in Chiyoda, Tokyo.

After the release of the album Takemoto Izumi Uta Kore in 2009, the company became dormant until it was fully dissolved and liquidated on February 7, 2019.

Video games created by Datam Polystar

Super Famicom
 Cacoma Knight (English version was published by SETA Corporation)
 Makeruna Makendou (English version was published by SETA Corporation)
 Makeruna! Makendō 2: Kimero Youkai Souri
 Musya (English version was published by SETA Corporation)
 Youchiensenki Madara (also titled Madara Saga)

Sega Saturn
 Dragon Master Silk
 Sugoventure! Dragon Master Silk Gaiden

PlayStation
 Makeruna! Makendō 2
 Pocke-Kano: Aida Yumi  	
 Pocke-Kano: Houjouin Shizuka 	
 Pocke-Kano: Ueno Fumio

Dreamcast
 Pocke-Kano: Yumi - Shizuka - Fumio

PlayStation 2
Trizeal (Japanese PlayStation 2 version)
Pure Pure Mimi to Shippo no Monogatari

References

External links
Datam Polystar

 
Video game companies of Japan
Mass media companies of Japan
Publishing companies of Japan
Video game companies established in 1990
Japanese companies established in 1990
Video game companies disestablished in 2019
Japanese companies disestablished in 2019